Biju Phukan; 18 February 1947 – 22 November 2017) was an Assamese actor. He was born in Dibrugarh, India, where he studied in the Dibrugarh HS Kanoi College and Dibrugarh Govt boys' higher secondary school Dibrugarh. He appeared in more than eighty Assamese feature films. His first movie was Dr. Bezbarua (1970).

His first role as leading actor was in Baruar Songshar followed by Aranya which established him as a 'hero'. One of his songs that attained fame and was successful in the charts was "Mon Hira Doi" from the film Bowari. His first release as a hero was Samarendra Narayan Dev's Aranya in 1971, which was adjudged the Best Regional Film at the National Film Awards.

He was residing in Guwahati. He was a former jury member of Indian Panorama. He died at Apollo Hospital in Guwahati on 22 November 2017, aged 70.

Filmography

Drama
Samay, written by Natyasamrat Prafulla Bora
Neta, written by Natyasamrat Prafulla Bora
Captain Gogoi
Falgo
Haiya Dhuwai Nile

Bengali movies
Hotel Snow Fox (1976)
Aparajita (1976)
Doishyu Ratnakar
Gajamukta (1994)

References

External links
 
 Rupaliparda

1947 births
2017 deaths
Male actors in Assamese cinema
Indian male film actors
People from Dibrugarh district